The 2013 Breeders' Cup Challenge series provided winners of the designated races with an automatic "Win and You're In" Berth in the 2013 Breeders' Cup. Races were chosen by the Breeders' Cup organization and included key prep races in the various Breeders' Cup divisions from around the world.

For 2013, nine races were added to the series: the Triple Bend Handicap, Bing Crosby, Yorkshire Oaks, Lowther Stakes, Pat O’Brien, Juvenile Trial, Pocahontas, Iroquois and Canadian Stakes. A number of races that had previously been part of the series were dropped, including the Metropolitan Handicap, Hollywood Gold Cup, Delaware Handicap, Pretty Polly, Greenwood Cup, San Diego, Turf Monster, Hopeful, Del Mar Futurity, Gallant Bloom, Fillies Mile, Beresford, Middle Park (since its Breeders' Cup race, the Juvenile Sprint, had been eliminated), Canadian International and E.P. Taylor Stakes.

Thirty-six horses entered in the Breeders' Cup races qualified via the challenge series, including four of the winners. These were:
 Mucho Macho Man, who qualified for the Classic by winning the Awesome Again Stakes
 Beholder, who won the Zenyatta Stakes to qualify for the Distaff
 Dank, who earned her berth in the Filly & Mare Turf by winning the Beverly D. Stakes
 Wise Dan, who won the Woodbine Mile to qualify for the Mile

The winners of the 2013 Breeders' Cup Challenge series races are shown below. The last column shows whether the horse was subsequently entered in the Breeders' Cup, and if so, whether they achieved a top three finish.

References

Breeders' Cup Challenge
Breeders' Cup Challenge series
Breeders' Cup